The 1921–22 season was Manchester United's 26th in the Football League and their 11th in the First Division.

At the end of the season, United finished last in the league and were relegated to the Second Division, where they had not played since 1906.

First Division

FA Cup

References

Manchester United F.C. seasons
Manchester United